Delia Dueñas Smith (July 17, 1966 – May 31, 1985), better known as Pepsi Paloma, was a Filipino-American dancer and actress in the Philippines.  She was one of the popular Softdrinks Beauties introduced in the 1980s along with Sarsi Emmanuelle and Coca Nicolas. She was known for films such as Brown Emanuelle (1981), The Victim (1982), Krus sa Bawat Punglo (1982), Virgin People (1983), Snake Sisters (1983), Naked Island (1984), Matukso kaya ang Anghel? (1984) and Room 69 (1985).

Career
Born Delia Dueñas Smith, Paloma was the eldest daughter of Lydia Dueñas, a native of Borac, Northern Samar, and an American letter carrier, Kenneth Smith, who abandoned his family when the children were still young. When she was 14 years old, a talent scout named Tita Ester brought Paloma to talent manager Rey dela Cruz in 1980 for a possible film career. In 1981, she made her debut in the movie Brown Emmanuelle. She was given the stage name Pepsi Paloma and was promoted as one of the members of the so-called “soft drink” beauties together with Coca Nicolas and Sarsi Emmanuelle.

Rape case and aftermath
After appearing in a handful of films, Paloma was involved in a highly publicized scandal when she accused comedians Vic Sotto, Joey de Leon, and Ricardo "Richie D'Horsie" Reyes of rape. According to Paloma's account, she and fellow actress Guada Guarin were drugged, brought to a room at the Sulô Hotel in Quezon City, and then raped. Actor and future senator Tito Sotto, who is also Vic's older brother, soon became involved, compelling Paloma to drop the charges by allegedly intimidating her with a gun. Sotto had drawn up an Affidavit of Desistance and obtained her signature, although some newspaper reports stated that it was Pepsi's mother who signed the document on her behalf. Had the suspects been convicted of the charges, they would have faced the death penalty—execution by electric chair, the same fate that befell three of four convicted rapists in actress Maggie de la Riva's case two decades prior. According to a retracted article by the Philippine Daily Inquirer, it was also around this time that Paloma was reported missing and was found being held captive by convicted felon Bienvenido "Ben Ulo" Mendoza, a relative of the Sottos. Despite his arrest and confession, there is no record that Ben Ulo was ever charged with any crime connected with the abduction of Paloma.
 
Although the three suspects initially denied Paloma's accusations, they later issued a public apology, on their knees on live TV, and in an article published by the People's Journal on October 13, 1982, saying "We hope that you will not allow the error we have committed against you to stand as a stumbling block to that future which we all look forward to. We, therefore, ask you to find it in your heart to pardon us for the wrong which we have done against you". Due to the signed Affidavit of Desistance, Paloma did not pursue her complaint and the case did not go to court.

Death
On May 31, 1985, Paloma was found dead in her apartment, in an apparent suicide by hanging. According to police investigation, the rape case was one factor of her suicide. A diary, citing monetary problems and anxieties over her relationship with her mother and her boyfriend, was found in her bedroom, although the authenticity of the journal entries have been questioned, especially by her manager Babette "Babe" Corcuerra, who claims she was actually earning well. The mysteries surrounding the case and Paloma's death were alleged to be immortalized in the popular Eraserheads song "Spoliarium". She was buried at Olongapo Memorial Park in Zambales.

Aftermath
Despite the suspects' earlier apology, Tito Sotto has maintained his position against any involvement in the whitewashing of the rape case and alleges that the scandal was a gimmick by Paloma's party for publicity. Sotto said that he was not involved as a perpetrator in the rape of Paloma and he denied using his position in government to influence the court decision. Sotto became Vice Mayor in Quezon City in 1988 before being elected as a Senator in 1992. In 2018, the elder Sotto requested The Philippine Inquirer to remove published articles available online mentioning the Pepsi Paloma Case damaging to his current reputation as a Senator.

References

1966 births
1985 deaths
Actresses from Manila
People from Northern Samar
Suicides by hanging
1985 suicides
Filipino people of American descent
Suicides in the Philippines
Death conspiracy theories